Minnie Dupree (January 19, 1875 – May 23, 1947) was an American stage, film, and radio actress. During the Great Depression, she helped organize the Stage Relief Fund to assist unemployed actors and actresses.

Biography
Born in San Francisco, California, Dupree made her acting debut in a touring company under John A. Stevens in 1887. The next year, she made a big impression in a small role in William Gillette's New York play Held by the Enemy. She received a number of important supporting roles, working with Richard Mansfield, Stuart Robson, and Nat Goodwin. She landed a starring role in 1900 in Women and Wine. Other leading roles followed, including in The Climbers (1901), A Rose o' Plymouth-town (1902), Heidelberg (1902), The Music Master (1904), and The Road to Yesterday (1906).

Her later stage career was not successful, and exceptions were The Old Soak (1922), The Shame Woman (1923), Outward Bound (1924), playing Mrs. Midge, and as a replacement for the part of Martha Brewster in the hit Arsenic and Old Lace in 1941. Her last stage appearance was in Land's End (1946). She acted in two feature-length films: The Young in Heart (1938), with Janet Gaynor, Douglas Fairbanks, Jr., Paulette Goddard, Roland Young, and Billie Burke, and Anne of Windy Poplars (1940).

Personal life
On November 8, 1896, it was announced that she would marry Major William H. Langley, a reputed millionaire, at the end of the season. At the time, she was described as a "handsome blonde, and the possessor of a magnificent head of curly hair."

Dupree died in New York City on May 23, 1947, at age 72.

References

Further reading

Articles
 Arthur, Helen. "Beauties of the American Stage". National Magazine. December 1904. p. 328 (image), p. 329 (article).
 "Minnie Dupree an Advocate of Woman Suffrage".The Providence Evening News. October 15, 1914.
 "Stage Women's War Relief Makes Its First Shipment: First Box of Surgical Dressings Packed Under Supervision of Minnie Dupree". Billboard. May 5, 1917. p. 16
 Parsons, Louella. "'Over the Hill,' Old Melodrama, May Be Remade; Minnie Dupree Picked for Aged Mother". The Milwaukee Sentinel. November 29, 1938.
 "Portrait of Actress Brought from Frat". The Lawrence Journal-World. May 11, 1940.
 Winchell, Walter. "The Star's Dressing Room". The Daytona Beach Morning Journal. February 7, 1947.
 "Minnie Dupree Dies; Stage, Film Actress". The Montreal Gazette. May 24, 1947.

Books
Briscoe, Johnson (1907). "January 19: Minnie Dupree". The Actor's Birthday Book: An Authoritative Insight Into the Lives of the Men and Women of the Stage Born Between January 1 and December 31. New York: Moffat, Yard & Company. p. 30.
 Browne, Walter; Koch, E. De Roy, editors (1908). Whos Who On the Stage, 1908. New York: B. Dodge & Company. p. 141.
 Hines, Dixie; Hanaford, Harry Prescott, editors (1914). Who's Who in Music and Drama. New York: H. P. Hanaford. p. 104.
 Parker, John, editor (1922). Who's Who in the Theatre. Boston: Small,Maynard & Company. p. 247.

External links

1875 births
1947 deaths
19th-century American actresses
20th-century American actresses
Actresses from San Francisco
American film actresses
American radio actresses
American stage actresses